Burkholderia latens is a gram-negative, aerobic, non-spore-forming bacterium from the genus of Burkholderia and the family of Burkholderiaceae which belongs to the Burkholderia cepacia complex. Colonies of Burkholderia latens are moist.

References

External links
Type strain of Burkholderia latens at BacDive -  the Bacterial Diversity Metadatabase

Burkholderiaceae
Bacteria described in 2008